Noble Glacier is a small glacier lying just north of Flagstaff Glacier on the east side of Keller Peninsula, King George Island, in the South Shetland Islands. Named by the United Kingdom Antarctic Place-Names Committee (UK-APC) in 1960 for Hugh M. Noble of Falkland Islands Dependencies Survey (FIDS), glaciologist at Admiralty Bay in 1957, who made detailed studies of the regime of Flagstaff and Stenhouse Glacier.

See also
 List of glaciers in the Antarctic
 Glaciology

References
 

Glaciers of King George Island (South Shetland Islands)